Kiwaatule is a township within the city of Kampala, Uganda's capital.

Location
Kiwaatule is bordered by Najjera to the north, Naalya to the east, Banda to the south, Ntinda to the south-west, Kigoowa to the west, and Kulambiro to the north-west. The coordinates of Kiwaatule are 0°21'56.0"N, 32°37'31.0"E (Latitude:0.365556; Longitude:32.625275).

Overview
Kiwatule is mainly a middle class residential neighborhood with a smattering of commercial establishments. The Kampala Northern Bypass Highway traverses the neighborhood. The People's Progressive Party, one of the political parties in Uganda, maintains its headquarters at Kiwaatule.

Points of interest
The following additional points of interest are located in or near Kiwaatule:
 Sunset Apartment Complex - A condominium and apartment development by National Housing and Construction Company

See also
 Kyambogo
 Nakawa Division

References

External links
  Two Pakistan Nationals Held Over Gang Rape

Neighborhoods of Kampala
Nakawa Division